Streitaxt (Battleaxe) was a wolfpack of German U-boats that operated during the World War II Battle of the Atlantic from 20 October to 2 November 1942.

Service
The group was responsible for sinking twelve merchant ships and damaging a further seven merchant ships.

Raiding History

U-boats

Bibliography

References
Notes

Wolfpacks of 1942